Ayamé is a town in south-eastern Ivory Coast, near the border of Ghana. It is a sub-prefecture and commune of Aboisso Department in Sud-Comoé Region, Comoé District.
In 2014, the population of the sub-prefecture of Ayamé was 14,195.

Villages
The eight villages of the sub-prefecture of Ayamé and their population in 2014 are:
 Ayamé  (8 601)
 Diéviesso  (924)
 Akressi  (2 645)
 Amoakro  (695)
 Biaka  (293)
 Ebokoffikro  (387)
 Gnamienkro  (325)
 Koukourandoumi  (325)

References

Sub-prefectures of Sud-Comoé
Communes of Sud-Comoé